Sculpting in Time (Russian "Запечатлённое время", literally "Captured Time") is a book by Russian filmmaker Andrei Tarkovsky about art and cinema in general, and his own films in particular. It was originally published in 1985 in German shortly before the author's death, and published in English in 1987, translated by Kitty Hunter-Blair. The title refers to Tarkovsky's own name for his style of filmmaking.

Synopsis 
The book's main statement about the nature of cinema is summarized in the statement, "The dominant, all-powerful factor of the film image is rhythm, expressing the course of time within the frame." It contains a great deal of poetry written by the filmmaker's father Arseny Alexandrovich Tarkovsky along with a fair amount of Tarkovsky's personal writings on his life and work, lectures and discussions during making of Andrei Rublev with a film history student named Olga Surkova, who later became a professional critic and helped in writing of this book.

The book has commentary on each of his 7 major feature films, and his complex relationship with the Soviet Union. The final chapter, a discussion of his film The Sacrifice, was dictated in the last weeks of his life.

Origin of the book 
Tarkovsky decided to write this book in part to explain, or give insight, to his puzzled audience on the nature of his films. In the Introduction of his book, he cites many letters he received throughout the years, both of appraisal and discouragement. The letters, regardless of their nature, seemed to agree on one thing: the people did not understand what was going on in the film. This book, as Tarkovsky explains, is a response to the questions of an audience that is willing to dialogue with him. Tarkovsky has also cited film critic Olga Surkova as an inspiration for the creation of the book and that discussions with her greatly influenced the work's content.

Reception 
Critical reception for Sculpting in Time has been positive, with the Slavic Review praising the book's translation, content, and layout. Eric David praised the book, calling it one of the “greatest books on filmmaking written by a director”. Writing for the Sunday Times', Ian Christie stated that he acknowledges that the book accomplishes Tarkovsky’s purpose, which was to give insight into his creative process and to explain to his audience the logic behind his films.

Further reading

References

1985 non-fiction books
Books of film theory
Andrei Tarkovsky